The 2012 Towson Tigers football team represented Towson University in the 2012 NCAA Division I FCS football season. They were led by fourth-year head coach Rob Ambrose and played their home games at Johnny Unitas Stadium. They are a member of the Colonial Athletic Association (CAA). They finished the season 7–4, 6–2 in CAA. Due to Old Dominion (7–1 in CAA play) being ineligible for the conference title, the Tigers claimed a four way share of the CAA title. Despite the conference title, the Tigers were not invited to the FCS playoffs.

Schedule

Ranking movements

References

Towson
Towson Tigers football seasons
Colonial Athletic Association football champion seasons
Towson Tigers football